Claudine Williams (born 8 January 1976) is a Jamaican sprinter. She competed in the women's 400 metres at the 1992 Summer Olympics.

References

External links
 

1976 births
Living people
Athletes (track and field) at the 1992 Summer Olympics
Jamaican female sprinters
Olympic athletes of Jamaica
Place of birth missing (living people)
Pan American Games medalists in athletics (track and field)
Pan American Games bronze medalists for Jamaica
Athletes (track and field) at the 1999 Pan American Games
Medalists at the 1999 Pan American Games
Central American and Caribbean Games medalists in athletics
Olympic female sprinters
20th-century Jamaican women